Efringen-Kirchen is a municipality in the district of Lörrach in Baden-Württemberg, Germany.

Fortifications
During World War I fortifications were built at Istein, these were destroyed at the end of the war. In 1936 plans were drawn up to turn the location into the "Gibraltar of the West" with two kilometres of underground passages linking gun emplacements and bunkers.  The site was to host an underground garage for over 100 tanks, 3600 men and as part of the Siegfried Line it would dwarf similar Maginot Line fortifications.  Work began in 1937 and Hermann Göring visited in the Spring of 1938.  By 1939 several installations were complete but as the war progressed advantageously for the Germans in 1940 the site remained unfinished.

Communities within Efringen-Kirchen
 Blansingen
 Efringen
 
 Huttingen
 Istein
 Kirchen
 Kleinkems
 Mappach
 Maugenhard
 Welmlingen
 Wintersweiler

Religion

Churches
 

Peterskirche, Blansingen

References

External links 
  Information about and images

Towns in Baden-Württemberg
Lörrach (district)
Baden